Laurens Jacobsz. van der Vinne (1712, Haarlem – 1742, Haarlem), was an 18th-century painter from the Northern Netherlands.

Biography
According to the RKD he was the son of Jacob van der Vinne and is known for interior decorations and winter landscapes. Like his grandfather and namesake Laurens van der Vinne, he also painted flowers in vases.

References

Laurens Jacobsz. van der Vinne on Artnet

1712 births
1742 deaths
18th-century Dutch painters
18th-century Dutch male artists
Dutch male painters
Artists from Haarlem